Prototheca wickerhamii is a ubiquitous green alga that does not have chlorophyll.  It is widely present in the environment but is a rare cause of infection in humans (protothecosis) and most commonly presents as nodules of the skin.  Most cases reported have a suppressed immune system (from drugs or disease). Infection usually results by direct traumatic inoculation.

Identification 
Diagnosis can be made through culture of diseased tissue in Sabouraud dextrose agar or by visualization of sporangia containing sporangiospores on tissue biopsy (using hematoxylin/eosin, GMS, or PAS histochemical stains). The organism incites a chronic granulomatous inflammation with infiltrate of histiocytes, lymphocytes, giant cells and occasional eosinophils. The organism has thick wall, internal septations, measures 3–11 µm in diameter. The sporangia have very small wedge-shaped endospores arranged radially and moulded (morula-like form).

Differential diagnosis: Protothecal sporangia may be confused with Coccidioides immitis, which are much larger

Antimicrobial therapy 
Treatment is not standardized. Amphotericin B, itraconazole, posaconazole and voriconazole have all been tried.

References 

Chlorellaceae